Francis Alanson Cunningham (November 9, 1804 – August 16, 1864) was a U.S. Representative from Ohio for one term from 1845 to 1847.

Biography 
Born in Abbeville County, South Carolina, Cunningham moved to Eaton, Ohio, in 1826.
He taught school. He studied medicine and commenced practice in 1829. He served as clerk of the court of Preble County in 1833.

Cunningham was elected as a Democrat to the Twenty-ninth Congress (March 4, 1845 – March 3, 1847). He was an unsuccessful candidate for reelection in 1846 to the Thirtieth Congress. He studied law. He was admitted to the bar in 1847 and began practice in Eaton.
He was appointed additional paymaster of Volunteers by President Polk December 30, 1847. He was commissioned paymaster in the Regular Army March 2, 1849, and was retired from active service August 27, 1863.

Death
He died in Eaton, Ohio, August 16, 1864.
He was interred in Mound Hill Cemetery.

External links

1804 births
1864 deaths
People from Eaton, Ohio
People from Abbeville County, South Carolina
Ohio lawyers
Physicians from Ohio
United States Army paymasters
Democratic Party members of the United States House of Representatives from Ohio
19th-century American politicians
19th-century American lawyers